St Helena was a battle honour awarded to the following Militia battalions of the British Army for guarding Boer prisoners on the island of Saint Helena during the Second Boer War of 1899–1902:

 4th Battalion, the Gloucestershire Regiment (Royal North Gloucestershire Regiment of Militia)
 3rd Battalion, the Duke of Edinburgh's (Wiltshire Regiment) (Royal Wiltshire Regiment of Militia)

References
Baker, A.H.R.: Battle Honours Of The British And Commonwealth Armies; Ian Allan, 1986, pp. 97, 283

Battle honours of the British Army
Battle honours of the Second Boer War